Computers designed or built in Britain include:

Acorn Computers
Acorn Eurocard systems
Acorn System 1
Acorn Atom
BBC Micro
Acorn Electron
BBC Master
Acorn Archimedes
RiscPC
Acorn Network Computer
Amstrad
Amstrad CPC
Amstrad PCW
Amstrad NC100
PC1512
PPC 512 and 640
Amstrad PC2286
Amstrad Mega PC
Apricot Computers
Apricot PC
Apricot Portable
Apricot Picobook Pro
Bear Microcomputer Systems
Newbear 77-68
Bywood Electronics
SCRUMPI 2 
SCRUMPI 3 
Cambridge Computer
Cambridge Z88
CAP computer
Compukit UK101
Dragon 32/64
Enterprise (computer)
Ferranti MRT
Flex machine
Gemini Computers
Gemini Galaxy
Gemini Challenger
GEC
GEC 2050
GEC 4000 series
GEC Series 63
Grundy NewBrain
ICL
ICL 2900 Series
ICL Series 39
One Per Desk
Jupiter Ace
Nascom
Nascom 1
Nascom 2
Plessey System 250
Raspberry Pi
Research Machines
Research Machines 380Z
LINK 480Z
RM Nimbus
SAM Coupé
Science of Cambridge
 MK14
Sinclair Research
ZX80
ZX81
ZX Spectrum
Sinclair QL
Systime Computers Ltd
Systime 1000, 3000, 5000, 8750, 8780
Systime Series 2, Series 3
Tangerine Computer Systems
Tangerine Microtan 65
Oric-1
Oric Atmos
Tatung Einstein
Transam
Triton
Tuscan

Mechanical computers
Difference engine
Analytical Engine
Bombe

Early British computers
AEI 1010
APEXC
Atlas (computer)
Automatic Computing Engine
Colossus computer
CTL Modular One
Digico Micro 16
EDSAC
EDSAC 2
Elliott Brothers (computer company)
Elliott 152
Elliott 503
Elliott 803
Elliott 4100 Series
EMIDEC 1100
English Electric
English Electric DEUCE
English Electric KDF8
English Electric KDF9
English Electric KDP10 
English Electric System 4
Ferranti
Ferranti Argus
Ferranti Mark 1, or Manchester Electronic Computer
Ferranti Mercury
Ferranti Orion
Ferranti Pegasus
Ferranti Perseus
Ferranti Sirius
Nimrod (computer)
Harwell computer
Harwell CADET
Hollerith Electronic Computer
ICS Multum
ICT
ICT 1301
ICT 1900 series
LEO (computer)
Luton Analogue Computing Engine
Manchester computers
Manchester Mark 1
Manchester Baby
Marconi
Marconi Transistorised Automatic Computer (T.A.C.)
Marconi Myriad
Metrovick 950
Pilot ACE
Royal Radar Establishment Automatic Computer
SOLIDAC

ICL mainframe computers

References

Computer
Early British computers
Lists of computer hardware
Computers designed in the United Kingdom